Ontological security is a stable mental state derived from a sense of continuity in regard to the events in one's life. Anthony Giddens (1991) refers to ontological security as a sense of order and continuity in regard to an individual's experiences. He argues that this is reliant on people's ability to give meaning to their lives. Meaning is found in experiencing positive and stable emotions, and by avoiding chaos and anxiety. If an event occurs that is not consistent with the meaning of an individual's life, this will threaten that individual's ontological security. Ontological security also involves having a positive view of self, the world, and the future.

Ontological security threatened by death
Philip A. Mellor and Chris Shelling talk about this concept in regard to thanatology, arguing that when death strikes, it causes people to "question the meaningfulness and reality of the social frameworks in which they participate, shattering their ontological security"

Ontological security threatened by anthropogenic climate change
Climate change poses a threat to people's sense of continuity in their lives. In her book, Living in Denial: Climate Change, Emotions, and Everyday Life, the sociologist Kari Norgaard discusses how climate change impacts the ontological security of Norwegians and leads them to deny responsibility.

The previously stable climate shaped Norway's cultural heritage. For example, skiing in the winter has been a longtime tradition. The shortened ski season has disrupted their sense of continuity of the seasons. The changing climate causes people to question how things will be in the future as the warming trend continues. These disruptions to cultural norms affect people's senses of cultural and self identity. This can result in an erosion of a sense of purpose.

Also as mentioned in this book, a quote from the psychiatrist Robert Lifton describes how people begin to question their sense that the world is a good place, and they become numb to the threat of a changing climate as result of a crisis of meaning in the continuity of their lives. A quote from the sociologist Ulrich Beck describes that on a societal level, pervasive exposure to risk threatens ontological security and erodes social networks.

Ontological security can be supported through climate change by increasing individual's tolerance to emotional experiences and reflective functioning. When this process is done collectively, enabling strong social and community ties, communities are more resilient and psychologically flexible. When people have strong community ties and have a belief in social efficacy, they respond adaptively in the threat of disaster.

Ontological security associated with home ownership
"It has been said that people need the confidence, continuity and trust in the world which comprise ontological security in order to lead happy and fulfilled lives, and furthermore that ontological security can be attained more through owner occupied than rented housing.".

Ontological security in children

Children are more likely to have a positive ontological security when the child's parents own their own home. Reportedly, home ownership also improves parenting and allows for a future transfer of assets, thus facilitating ontological security.

What is also true is in Societies such as Germany and other Northern European States where renting is stable, and well regulated, the issue of stability does not have to equate with home ownership based on mortgages.

In the UK where working poor and many middle income families are under incredible financial stress, due to the increasing cost of home ownership, and of renting which is paying for the mortgages of landlords with many properties, all of which is urged by Government (social housing rents set at 80% of the market rate for private housing) as part of the ideology of 'growing the economy' which in turn creates a situation of  chronic stress, that leads to a wide range of health related issues which impact children's lives adversely.

The issue of ontological security, then, is to do with security of tenure, with regard to stability in a child's home life and the life of his or her parents, rather than home ownership per se.

One has to be cautious in this regard to avoid co-opting the concept of ontological security for any specific economic agenda, and always be focused on the lived experience and how it plays out under the influence of Government policies and events in the material concrete reality.

Furthermore, reducing the matter of a child's ontological security to the material aspect of housing ignores issues such as 'traditional' parenting practices, religiosity, unresolved parental trauma disrupting empathy-based relationships and other chronic stressors that are almost ubiquitous.

Ontological security in adult learners
"Adult educators also must secure the learners' ontological security against existential anxieties by associating learners' network and groups based on trust".

Ontological security in international relations 
The concept of ontological security has been applied in international relations. It has been argued that states seek to ensure their ontological security (the security of self and self-conception), in addition to their pursuit of physical security (such as protecting the territorial integrity of the state). To ensure their ontological security, states may even jeopardize their physical security. Ontological security in world politics can be defined as the possession, on the level of the unconscious and practical consciousness, of answers to fundamental questions that all polities in some way need to address such as existence, finitude, relations with others and their autobiography. Collective actors such as states become ontologically insecure when critical situations rupture their routines thus bringing fundamental questions to public discourse.

See also
Depersonalization
Personal identity
Maslow's hierarchy of needs
Thanatology
Anthony Giddens

References
Ronald David Laing The Divided Self, 1960.  
 Definition: A stable mental state derived from a sense of continuity and order in events. (Tony Bilton et al., Introductory Sociology, 3rd edition. London, Macmillan, 1996, p665)

Footnotes

External links
Scotland, Ontological security and psychosocial benefits from the home

Ontology
Sociological terminology